Lepidium didymum,  the lesser swine-cress, is a species of flowering plant in the family Brassicaceae.

Description
It blooms between July and September. The flowers are inconspicuous, the four white petals very short or absent, with 2 (rarely 4), stamens and the fruits consist of two rounded valves, notched at the apex, with a very short style between. They are also wrinkled and contain orange or reddish brown seeds, that are 1–5 mm long.

Taxonomy
It was first described and published by the Swedish botanist Carl Linnaeus in 'Mant. Pl.' (Mantissa Plantarum) on page 92 in 1767.

The specific epithet didymum, refers to the Greek word δίδυμα for 'twin' or 'in pairs', referring to the seed capsule.

Distribution
Lepidium didymum is of uncertain origin, but is often cited as native to South America, mainly Argentina, Bolivia, Brazil, Chile, Paraguay, Peru, Uruguay and Venezuela. It has been introduced elsewhere as a weed of cultivation.
It has naturalised across the globe, from Africa, Europe, Asia, Australasia, North America and South America. In Britain, it had been recorded from the wild by 1778, chiefly in England and the south of Ireland, growing on cultivated and waste ground, in gardens and lawns, by paths and roadsides.

Uses
The leaves of this plant are edible, and have a salty, cress or mustard flavour.

References

didymum
Plants described in 1767
Flora of South America